"Melrose", also known as the Old President's House, is a historic home located on the campus of Cheyney University of Pennsylvania in Cheyney, Delaware County, Pennsylvania.  It is a -story, vernacular stone residence.  It has three sections: the original section built before 1785, a three-bay addition built in 1807, and a two-bay addition built about 1850.  The 122-acre farm for which the house served as the main residence became the basis for the Cheyney University of Pennsylvania campus.  The house served as the President's House from 1903 to 1968.

The house was added to the National Register of Historic Places in 1986.

References

Houses on the National Register of Historic Places in Pennsylvania
Cheyney University of Pennsylvania
Houses in Delaware County, Pennsylvania
National Register of Historic Places in Delaware County, Pennsylvania